The 1984–85 Nationalliga A season was the 47th season of the Nationalliga A, the top level of ice hockey in Switzerland. Eight teams participated in the league, and HC Davos won the championship.

First round

Final round

Relegation

External links
 Championnat de Suisse 1984/85

Swiss
National League (ice hockey) seasons
1984–85 in Swiss ice hockey